NA-94 Chiniot-II is a constituency for the National Assembly of Pakistan. It comprises Chiniot Tehsil and a some areas of Bhowana Tehsil. The constituency was formally known as NA-86 (Jhang-I) before the 2018 delimitations. The creation of Chiniot District in 2009 from areas previously included in Jhang District mandated this change in nomenclature.

Members of Parliament

2018-2022: NA-100 Chiniot-II

Election 2002 

General elections were held on 10 Oct 2002. Muhammad Tahir Shah of PML-Q won by 53,639 votes.

Election 2008 

General elections were held on 18 Feb 2008. Syed Anayat Ali Shah of Pakistan Peoples Party Parliamentarian (PPPP) won by 57,583 votes.

Election 2013 

General elections were held on 11 May 2013. Qaiser Ahmed Shaikh of PML-N won by 77,512 votes and became the  member of National Assembly.

Election 2018 
General elections were held on 25 July 2018.

See also
NA-93 Chiniot-I
NA-95 Faisalabad-I

References

External links
 Election result's official website

Chiniot